Eksingedalen or Eksingadalen is a valley that makes up the northeastern part of Vaksdal Municipality in Vestland County, Norway.

The Ekso River (also known as the Storelvi River) runs through the entire valley, from alpine lakes all the way down to the Eidsfjorden, a small branch off the Inner Osterfjorden. The Stølsheimen Mountains surround the Eksingedalen valley. The Modalen valley lies over the mountains to the north and the Modalen Tunnel connects the two valleys.  

Mainly a farming area, about 200-300 people live in Eksingedalen. It is the site of a number of traditional farms including the historic Gullbrå, Ekse, and Trefall farms. Inga Litamor (Choral EG 168. 1901) a composition by Edvard Grieg was based on a traditional folk melody from Eksingedalen.

The village of Eidslandet is situated in the lower parts of Eksingedalen at the head of Eidsfjorden, an arm of the inner Osterfjorden.  The Myster kraftverk hydroelectric power plant is headquartered in Eidslandet. Myster kraftverk is owned and operated by Bergenshalvøens Kommunale Kraftselskap.

County Road 344 runs through most of the valley, and County Road 569 running from the Modalen Tunnel to the southern end of the valley. Eksingedal Church and Nesheim Church are both located in the valley.

References

External links
Map of Eksingedalen

Valleys of Vestland
Vaksdal